Fred Goldberg is a professional poker player from Hollywood, Florida.

Poker career
Goldberg's first major poker success came in the 2006 World Series of Poker main event, where he finished in 10th place winning $1,154,527. Goldberg was able to find continued success after the 2006 WSOP. He finished 48th in the 2008 WSOP 2,000 no-limit hold 'em event earning $7,823. He was elimated in 2008 WSOP Main Event by Brian "ZBT" Horton and did not cash.

In 2011, Goldberg's entered the final table in the Borgata Poker Open as 2nd in chips. He eventually finished 4th earning $280,925. Controversy erupted when Goldberg confronted eventual winner Bahbak Oboodi's rail, resulting in fans being ejected from the audience.

He was known for bearing a strong resemblance to Chris Moneymaker, the 2003 World Series of Poker Main Event champion. Since then, Goldberg has cashed in some World Poker Tour events and had some success at the 2007 World Series of Poker. At the 2007 World Series of Poker, he had five cashes and won his first career bracelet in a $1,500 buy-in Mixed Hold'em (Limit/No Limit) championship winning $204,935.

As of 2015, his total live tournament winnings exceed $2,400,000. His twelve cashes at the WSOP account for $1,412,891 of those winnings.

World Series of Poker bracelets

References

External links
Hendon Mob tournament results

American poker players
People from Florida
Living people
World Series of Poker bracelet winners
Year of birth missing (living people)